The Tripura Hill People's Party (THPP)is a Tripuri nationalist political party in the Tripura region of India.

History
The THPP is led by Debabrata Koloi.

See also
Tripuri nationalism
Tripura rebellion

References

Tripuri nationalism